Rebecca Helferich Clarke (27 August 1886 – 13 October 1979) was a British-American classical composer and violist. Internationally renowned as a viola virtuoso, she also became one of the first female professional orchestral players.<ref name=broad>{{cite book|last=Broad|first= Leah|title= Quartet: How Four Women Changed the Musical World]|publisher=Faber and Faber |year=2023}}</ref> Rebecca Clarke claimed both British and American nationalities and spent substantial periods of her life in the United States, where she permanently settled after World War II. She was born in Harrow and studied at the Royal Academy of Music and Royal College of Music in London. Stranded in the United States at the outbreak of World War II, she married composer and pianist James Friskin in 1944. Clarke died at her home in New York at the age of 93.

Although Clarke's output was not large, her work was recognised for its compositional skill and artistic power. Some of her works have yet to be published (and many were only recently published); those that were published in her lifetime were largely forgotten after she stopped composing. Scholarship and interest in her compositions revived in 1976. The Rebecca Clarke Society was established in 2000 to promote the study and performance of her music.

Early life

Clarke was born in Harrow, England, to Joseph Thacher Clarke, an American, and his German wife, Agnes Paulina Marie Amalie Helferich. Her father was interested in music, and Clarke started on violin after sitting in on lessons that were being given to her brother, Hans Thacher Clarke, who was 15 months her junior. She began her studies at the Royal Academy of Music in 1903, but was withdrawn by her father in 1905 after her harmony teacher Percy Hilder Miles proposed to her. He later left her his Stradivarius violin in his will. She made the first of many visits to the United States shortly after leaving the Royal Academy. She then attended the Royal College of Music, becoming one of Sir Charles Villiers Stanford's first female composition students. Her substantial Theme and Variations for piano dates from this period.

At Stanford's urging she shifted her focus from the violin to the viola, just as the latter was coming to be seen as a legitimate solo instrument. She studied with Lionel Tertis, who was considered by some the greatest violist of the day. In 1910 she composed a setting of Chinese poetry, called "Tears", in collaboration with a group of fellow students at RCM. She also sang under the direction of Ralph Vaughan Williams in a student ensemble organised by Clarke to study and perform Palestrina's music.

Following her criticism of his extra-marital affairs, Clarke's father turned her out of the house and cut off her funds. She had to leave the Royal College in 1910 and supported herself through her viola playing. Clarke (along with Jessie Grimson) became one of the first female professional orchestral musicians when she was selected by Sir Henry Wood to play in the Queen's Hall Orchestra in 1912. In 1916 she moved to the United States to continue her performing career. A short, lyrical piece for viola and piano entitled Morpheus, composed under the pseudonym of "Anthony Trent", was premiered at her 1918 joint recital with cellist May Mukle in New York City. Reviewers praised the "Trent", largely ignoring the works credited to Clarke premiered in the same recital. Her compositional career peaked in a brief period, beginning with the viola sonata she entered in a 1919 competition sponsored by Elizabeth Sprague Coolidge, Clarke's neighbour and a patron of the arts.

In a field of 72 entrants, Clarke's sonata tied for first place with a composition by Ernest Bloch. Coolidge later declared Bloch the winner. Reporters speculated that "Rebecca Clarke" was only a pseudonym for Bloch himself, or at least that it could not have been Clarke who wrote these pieces, as the idea that a woman could write such a beautiful work was socially inconceivable. The sonata was well received and had its first performance at the Berkshire music festival in 1919. In 1921 Clarke again made an impressive showing in Coolidge's composition competition with her piano trio, though again failed to take the prize. A 1923 rhapsody for cello and piano followed, sponsored by Coolidge, making Clarke the only female recipient of Coolidge's patronage. These three works represent the height of Clarke's compositional career.

Later life and marriage
Clarke, in 1924, embarked upon a career as a solo and ensemble performer in London, after first completing a world tour in 1922–23. In 1927 she helped form the English Ensemble, a piano quartet that included herself, Marjorie Hayward, Kathleen Long and May Mukle. She also performed on several recordings in the 1920s and 1930s, and participated in BBC music broadcasts. Her compositional output greatly decreased during this period. However, she continued to perform, participating in the Paris Colonial Exhibition in 1931 as part of the English Ensemble. Between 1927 and 1933 she was romantically involved with the British baritone John Goss, who was eight years her junior and married at the time. He had premiered several of her mature songs, two of which were dedicated to him, "June Twilight" and "The Seal Man". Her "Tiger, Tiger", finished at the time the relationship was ending, proved to be her last composition for solo voice until the early 1940s.

At the outbreak of World War II, Clarke was in the US visiting her two brothers, and was unable to obtain a visa to return to Britain. She lived for a while with her brothers' families and then in 1942 took a position as a governess for a family in Connecticut. She composed 10 works between 1939 and 1942, including her Passacaglia on an Old English Tune. She had first met James Friskin, a composer, concert pianist, and founding member of the Juilliard School faculty, and later to become her husband, when they were both students at the Royal College of Music. They renewed their friendship after a chance meeting on a Manhattan street in 1944 and married in September of that year when both were in their late 50s. According to musicologist Liane Curtis, Friskin was "a man who gave [Clarke] a sense of deep satisfaction and equilibrium."

Clarke has been described by Stephen Banfield as the most distinguished British female composer of the inter-war generation. However, her later output was sporadic. It has been suggested by musicologist Liane Curtis that Clarke had dysthymia, a chronic form of depression; the lack of encouragement—sometimes outright discouragement—she received for her work also made her reluctant to compose. Clarke did not consider herself able to balance her personal life and the demands of composition: "I can't do it unless it's the first thing I think of every morning when I wake and the last thing I think of every night before I go to sleep." After her marriage, she stopped composing, despite the encouragement of her husband, although she continued working on arrangements until shortly before her death. She also stopped performing.

Clarke sold the Stradivarius she had been bequeathed, and established the May Mukle prize at the Royal Academy. The prize is still awarded annually to an outstanding cellist. After her husband's death in 1967, Clarke began writing a memoir, entitled I Had a Father Too (or the Mustard Spoon); it was completed in 1973 but never published. In it she describes her early life, marked by frequent beatings from her father and strained family relations which affected her perceptions of her proper place in life. Clarke died in 1979 at her home in New York City at the age of 93, and was cremated.

Music

A large portion of Clarke's music features the viola, as she was a professional performer for many years. Much of her output was written for herself and the all-female chamber ensembles she played in, including the Norah Clench Quartet, the English Ensemble, and the d'Aranyi Sisters. She also toured worldwide, particularly with cellist May Mukle. Her works were strongly influenced by several trends in 20th-century classical music. Clarke also knew many leading composers of the day, including Bloch and Ravel, with whom her work has been compared.

The impressionism of Debussy is often mentioned in connection with Clarke's work, particularly its lush textures and modernistic harmonies. The Viola Sonata (published in the same year as the Bloch and the Hindemith Viola Sonata) is an example of this, with its pentatonic opening theme, thick harmonies, emotionally intense nature, and dense, rhythmically complex texture. The Sonata remains a part of standard repertoire for the viola. Morpheus, composed a year earlier, was her first expansive work, after over a decade of songs and miniatures. The Rhapsody that Coolidge sponsored is Clarke's most ambitious work: it is roughly 23 minutes long, with complex musical ideas and ambiguous tonalities contributing to the varying moods of the piece. In contrast, "Midsummer Moon", written the following year, is a light miniature, with a flutter-like solo violin line.

In addition to her chamber music for strings, Clarke wrote many songs. Nearly all of Clarke's early pieces are for solo voice and piano. Her 1933 "Tiger, Tiger", a setting of Blake's poem "The Tyger", is dark and brooding, almost expressionist. She worked on it for five years to the exclusion of other works during her tumultuous relationship with John Goss and revised it in 1972. Most of her songs, however, are lighter in nature. Her earliest works were parlour songs, and she went on to build up a body of work drawn primarily from classic texts by Yeats, Masefield, and A.E. Housman.

During 1939 to 1942, the last prolific period near the end of her compositional career, her style became more clear and contrapuntal, with emphasis on motivic elements and tonal structures, the hallmarks of neoclassicism. Dumka (1941), a recently published work for violin, viola, and piano, reflects the Eastern European folk styles of Bartók and Martinů. The "Passacaglia on an Old English Tune", also from 1941 and premiered by Clarke herself, is based on a theme attributed to Thomas Tallis which appears throughout the work. The piece is modal in flavor, mainly in the Dorian mode but venturing into the seldom-heard Phrygian mode. The piece is dedicated to "BB", ostensibly Clarke's niece Magdalen; scholars speculate that the dedication is more likely referring to Benjamin Britten, who organised a concert commemorating the death of Clarke's friend and major influence Frank Bridge. The Prelude, Allegro, and Pastorale, also composed in 1941, is another neoclassically influenced piece, written for clarinet and viola (originally for her brother and sister-in-law).

Clarke composed no large scale works such as symphonies. Her total output of compositions comprises 52 songs, 11 choral works, 21 chamber pieces, the Piano Trio, and the Viola Sonata. Her work was all but forgotten for a long period of time, but interest in it was revived in 1976 following a radio broadcast in celebration of her ninetieth birthday. Over half of Clarke's compositions remain unpublished and in the personal possession of her heirs, along with most of her writings. However, in the early 2000s more of her works were printed and recorded. Examples of recent publications include two string quartets and Morpheus, published in 2002.

Modern reception of Clarke's work has been generally positive. A 1981 review of her Viola Sonata called it a "thoughtful, well constructed piece" from a relatively obscure composer; a 1985 review noted its "emotional intensity and use of dark tone colours". Andrew Achenbach, in his review of a Helen Callus recording of several Clarke works, referred to Morpheus as "striking" and "languorous". Laurence Vittes noted that Clarke's "Lullaby" was "exceedingly sweet and tender". A 1987 review concluded that "it seems astonishing that such splendidly written and deeply moving music should have lain in obscurity all these years".

The Viola Sonata was the subject of BBC Radio 3's Building a Library survey on 17 October 2015. The top recommendation, chosen by Helen Wallace, was by Tabea Zimmermann (viola) and Kirill Gerstein (piano). In 2017 BBC Radio 3 devoted five hours to her music as Composer of the Week.Rebecca Clarke Society
The Rebecca Clarke Society was established in September 2000 to promote performance, scholarship, and awareness of the works of Rebecca Clarke. Founded by musicologists Liane Curtis and Jessie Ann Owens and based in the Women's Studies Research Center at Brandeis University, the Society has promoted recording and scholarship of Clarke's work, including several world premiere performances, recordings of unpublished material, and numerous journal publications.

The Society made available previously unpublished compositions from Clarke's estate. "Binnorie", a twelve-minute song based on Celtic folklore, was discovered in 1997, and not premiered until 2001. Over 25 previously unknown works have been published since the establishment of the Society. Several of Clarke's chamber works, including the expansive Rhapsody for cello and piano, and Cortège for solo piano (1930), dedicated to William Busch and premiered by him, were first recorded in 2000 on the Dutton label, using material from the Clarke estate. In 2002, the Society organised and sponsored the world premieres of the 1907 and 1909 violin sonatas.

The head of the Rebecca Clarke Society, Liane Curtis, is the editor of A Rebecca Clarke Reader, originally published by Indiana University Press in 2004. The book was withdrawn from circulation by the publisher following complaints from the current manager of Clarke's estate about the quotation of unpublished examples from Clarke's writings. However, the Reader has since been reissued by the Rebecca Clarke Society itself.

Selected works

Chamber music
 2 Pieces: Lullaby and Grotesque for viola (or violin) and cello
 Morpheus for viola and piano (1917–1918)
 Sonata for viola and piano (1919)
 Piano Trio (1921)
 Rhapsody for cello and piano (1923)
 Passacaglia on an Old English Tune for viola (or cello) and piano (?1940–1941)
 Prelude, Allegro and Pastorale for viola and clarinet (1941)

Vocal
 Shiv and the Grasshopper for voice and piano (1904); words from The Jungle Book by Rudyard Kipling
 Shy One for voice and piano (1912); words by William Butler Yeats
 He That Dwelleth in the Secret Place (Psalm 91) for soloists and mixed chorus (1921)
 The Seal Man for voice and piano (1922); words by John Masefield
 The Aspidistra for voice and piano (1929); words by Claude Flight
 The Tiger for voice and piano (1929–1933); words by William Blake
 God Made a Tree for voice and piano (1954); words by Katherine Kendall

Choral
 Music, When Soft Voices Die'' for mixed chorus (1907); words by Percy Bysshe Shelley

References

External links

 Rebecca Clarke Composer homepage
The Rebecca Clarke Society Homepage
 
 Songs by Rebecca Clarke on The Art Song Project
 Virginia Eskin hosts 'A Note to You' episode on Rebecca Clarke's life & music

1886 births
1979 deaths
20th-century classical composers
Alumni of the Royal Academy of Music
Alumni of the Royal College of Music
English classical violists
Women violists
English classical composers
People from Harrow, London
People with mood disorders
Pupils of Charles Villiers Stanford
British women classical composers
20th-century English composers
20th-century English women musicians
20th-century women composers
20th-century violists
British emigrants to the United States
Composers for viola